A list of men and women international rugby league matches played throughout 2023 and does not include wheelchair rugby league international matches. A † denotes a recognised, but unofficial match that did not contribute to the IRL World Rankings.

Season overview

Rankings
The following were the rankings at the beginning of the season.

January

Philippines vs North Macedonia men in Australia

Greece vs Philippines women in Australia

February

Malta vs North Macedonia men in Australia

March

Serbia women in France

April

France men in England

France women in England

May

Serbia men in Greece

August

Serbia men in the Czech Republic

September

Czech Republic men in Poland

October

Albania men in the Netherlands

Serbia men in the Netherlands

European Championship

Group stage

Final

European Championship B

Group stage

Final

Notes

References 

2023 in rugby league